Glaucostola is a genus of moths in the family Erebidae. The genus was erected by George Hampson in 1901.

Species
Glaucostola binotata
Glaucostola flavida
Glaucostola guttipalpis
Glaucostola maroniensis
Glaucostola metaxantha
Glaucostola simulans
Glaucostola underwoodi

References

External links

Phaegopterina
Moth genera